In enzymology, a glucuronate-2-sulfatase is an enzyme that catalyzes the chemical reaction of cleaving off the 2-sulfate groups of the 2-O-sulfo-D-glucuronate residues of chondroitin sulfate, heparin and heparitin sulfate.

This enzyme belongs to the family of hydrolases, specifically those acting on sulfuric ester bonds.  The systematic name of this enzyme class is polysaccharide-2-O-sulfo-D-glucuronate 2-sulfohydrolase. This enzyme is also called glucurono-2-sulfatase.  This enzyme participates in glycosaminoglycan degradation and glycan structures - degradation.

References

 

EC 3.1.6
Enzymes of unknown structure